Prestwick International Airport railway station (formerly known as Glasgow Prestwick Airport station) serves Glasgow Prestwick Airport, near the town of Prestwick, South Ayrshire, Scotland.

It opened on 5 September 1994. It is currently the only railway station in Scotland that is directly connected to an airport. It is also the only railway station in Scotland not managed by ScotRail or Network Rail.

Services

December 2019 
Monday - Saturday:
There are four trains per hour (two trains per hour in the evening) northbound to Glasgow and southbound to Ayr.

Sunday:
There are two trains per hour (one train per hour in the evening) northbound to Glasgow and southbound to Ayr.

Services between Kilmarnock and Stranraer don't usually call here, but there is one train northbound from Stranraer to Kilmarnock that calls here at 2236(Mon-Sat).

The fastest journey time to Glasgow is around 45 minutes.

References

External links 
 

Railway stations in South Ayrshire
Airport railway stations in the United Kingdom
SPT railway stations
Railway stations served by ScotRail
Railway stations in Great Britain opened in 1994
Railway stations opened by Railtrack